Maria A. Neidgardt  (1831-1904), was a Russian Empire noble and courtier.

Neidgardt was a noted philanthropist, decorated and officially recognized for her work: she was the chairperson of the royal women's charitable society from 1876 onward, and the founder of the Moscow Mariinsky School for Girls (1851).

References 
 Пятидесятилетие Дамскаго Попечительства о бедных в Москве Ведомства учреждений императрицы Марии с 17 декабря 1844 по 17 декабря 1894 годы. — Товарищество типографии А. И. Мамонтова, 1895. — 70 с.

1831 births
1904 deaths
Ladies-in-waiting from the Russian Empire
Philanthropists from the Russian Empire
19th-century philanthropists